Twackle was a Twitter aggregator created by Octagon Sports,  launched in late February 2009.  Similar to Digg, it incorporates user feedback into its ranking of items.

Twackle was used by several professional sports teams, including
 The Washington Mystics (WNBA) 
 The Washington Redskins (NFL) 
 The Phoenix Suns (NBA)

Sources

External links
Website
Octagon Digital

Twitter services and applications